

All-time top scorers (including qualifying rounds)

EHF Champions League Top Goalscorer by seasons
The top scorer award is for the player who amassed the most goals in the tournament, excluding the qualifying rounds.

Statistics

By player
Players with 2 or more titles are:

By country
Countries with 2 or more titles are:

By club 
Clubs with 2 or more titles are:

Notes

References

External links 
 EHF Champions League

Top Scorers
European